This is a list of parochial schools located in the Roman Catholic Diocese of Fresno, in California.

High schools
Garces Memorial High School, Bakersfield
 San Joaquin Memorial High School, Fresno

Primary schools
 Saint Anthony School - located in Atwater
 Our Lady of Guadalupe School - located in Bakersfield
 Our Lady of Perpetual Help School - located in Bakersfield
 Saint Francis Parish School - located in Bakersfield
 Our Lady of Perpetual Help - located in Clovis
 Our Lady of Victory School - located in Fresno
 Saint Anthony School - located in Fresno
 Saint Helen School - located in Fresno
 Our Lady of Miracles School - located in Gustine
 St. Rose/McCarthy School - located in Hanford
 Mary Immaculate Queen School - located in Lemoore
 Our Lady Of Fatima School - located in Los Banos
 Saint Joachim School - located in Madera
 Our Lady of Mercy School - located in Merced
 Saint Anne School - located in Porterville
 Saint La Salle School - located in Reedley
 Saint Ann School - located in Ridgecrest
 Saint Aloysius School - located in Tulare
 George McCann Memorial School - located in Visalia
 Saint John the Evangelist School - located in Wasco

schools
Education in Fresno, California
 
Fresno
Fresno